Ernest Latimer Stones (1865–1927) was an English amateur track and field athlete, who held the world pole vault record of  in 1889. He had broken the world record one year earlier in Southport, clearing .

Born in Ulverston, Lancashire in 1865, after moving to Bootle, Liverpool, Stones became AAA champion in 1888 and 1889, the Scottish Championships three times, the Canadian and Irish Championships both once, and is the only Briton ever to win an American pole vault title, which he did in 1889.
He died on 20 Oct 1927 at 267 Knowsley Road, Bootle his wife of 35 years, Mary Elizabeth (née Goodall) survived him.

References

1865 births
1927 deaths
Sportspeople from Bootle
British male pole vaulters
English male pole vaulters